Florian Grégoire Claude Lejeune (born 20 May 1991) is a French professional footballer who plays as a centre-back for Spanish La Liga club Rayo Vallecano, on loan from Deportivo Alavés.

Career

Early career
Lejeune was born in Paris and began his football career in July 1998 at the Centre de Formation de Paris, a youth sporting club designed to cater only to football players under the age of 19. After four months at the academy, he departed for Racing Club des Ternes, a local sporting club based in the 8th arrondissement of Paris. Lejeune spent two years at the club and, in 2000, was signed by Racing Club de France. He spent the majority of his youth career at the club and, after a five-year stay, moved down south to join Béziers Méditerranée Cheminots, a sports club more known for its athletics department. With Béziers, Lejeune played in the Championnat de France 14 ans Fédéraux league.

After one year at Béziers, Lejeune joined the youth academy of Sète. After two years with the club, he signed an amateur contract with Adge, which was playing in the Championnat de France amateur, the fourth level of French football. Lejeune spent the majority of the 2008–09 season playing on the club's reserve team. Towards the end of the campaign, he was called up to the senior team and made his amateur debut on 11 April 2009 appearing as a substitute in a 3–1 defeat to Gazélec Ajaccio. On 23 May, he made his first start in a 3–2 victory over Gap. The following week, Lejeune scored both goals for Agde in a 2–2 draw with Fréjus Saint-Raphaël.

Istres
In the summer of 2009, Lejeune joined Ligue 2 club Istres on trial. After impressing in two friendly matches, he was signed to a three-year professional contract and inserted onto the club's reserve team. Lejeune arrived at the club playing primarily in the defensive midfielder role, but ultimately switched to the centre back position. His positive play during the fall season with the reserves led to the player being called up to the senior team in January 2010. Lejeune made his professional debut on 19 January in a league match against Guingamp in a 0–0 draw with the player playing the entire match. Lejuene finished the campaign with 14 more appearances in the league playing the entire match in all of them.

Lejeune began the 2010–11 season as a starter and made his season debut in a 4–0 defeat to Ajaccio in the Coupe de la Ligue. In September, he was a surprise inclusion in the France under-20 team. His subsequent uprising into the spotlight and positive play with Istres led to the player being declared one of the best players in Ligue 2, despite only playing in a handful of matches. On 4 January 2011, French newspaper L'Equipe announced that Spanish club Real Madrid was monitoring Lejeune's progress. He was, subsequently, linked to a host of other clubs, notably English clubs Manchester United, Manchester City, and Arsenal and Italian clubs Napoli and Udinese with all the clubs reportedly likening him to former French international Laurent Blanc. However, despite the speculation, club president Francis Collado declared that he had not had official contact with any club linked to the player.

Villarreal

On 7 July 2011, French newspaper L'Equipe confirmed that Lejeune had reached an agreement with Spanish club Villarreal to sign a four-year contract. The transfer fee was priced at €1 million and Lejeune took his medical and signed his contract following the conclusion of his participation in the 2011 FIFA U-20 World Cup. He was placed onto the club's second team. After appearing in seven matches with the B team, Lejeune made his senior team debut on 6 November 2011 appearing as a substitute in a 0–0 draw with Espanyol. In January 2013, he was loaned to Ligue 1 side Stade Brestois 29. It was announced in July 2013 that Lejeune would be loaned out to the newly relegated club for another year.

Girona
After his loan with Brest ended, Lejeune signed a two-year deal with Girona FC also in the second level. He was an undisputed first-choice for the Catalans, scoring his first goal on 8 February 2015, in a 1–0 win at CD Tenerife.

Lejeune finished the campaign with 40 appearances and five goals, as his side narrowly missed out promotion in the play-offs.

Manchester City
On 28 August 2015 Lejeune was transferred to Manchester City, being immediately loaned back to Girona for one year.

Eibar
On 29 June 2016, Lejeune signed a four-year deal with SD Eibar.

Newcastle United
On 4 July 2017, Lejeune joined Newcastle United on a five-year contract. In April 2019, he was ruled out of the rest of the 2018–19 season with a knee injury. Lejeune scored both of his first two goals for Newcastle in injury time of a 2–2 draw with Everton on 21 January 2020.

Deportivo Alavés
On 11 September 2020, Lejeune signed for Deportivo Alavés on a one-year loan deal. In July of the following year, he completed a permanent move to the club for an undisclosed fee.

Rayo Vallecano (loan) 
On 29 July 2022, Lejeune joined Rayo Vallecano on a season-long loan.

Career statistics

References

External links

 

1991 births
Living people
Footballers from Paris
French footballers
France youth international footballers
Association football defenders
RCO Agde players
FC Istres players
Villarreal CF B players
Villarreal CF players
Stade Brestois 29 players
Girona FC players
Manchester City F.C. players
SD Eibar footballers
Newcastle United F.C. players
Deportivo Alavés players
Rayo Vallecano players
Championnat National players
Ligue 2 players
Segunda División players
La Liga players
Segunda División B players
Ligue 1 players
Premier League players
French expatriate footballers
Expatriate footballers in England
Expatriate footballers in Spain
French expatriate sportspeople in England
French expatriate sportspeople in Spain